Kern River Pipeline is a  long natural gas pipeline line extending from southwestern Wyoming to its terminus near Bakersfield, California. The pipeline supplies local gas distribution companies, power plants, and heavy industry in Utah, Nevada, and California. It is owned and operated by the Kern River Gas Transmission Company, a subsidiary of Berkshire Hathaway Energy. Its FERC code is 99.

The line provides 80% of the natural gas used in the Las Vegas Valley.  The Goodsprings Waste Heat Recovery Station recovers up to 7.5MW of energy from a compressor station.

There are 11 compressor stations on the line. The gas line delivers gas to Utah, Nevada, California and Arizona. Most of the gas is from the Pinedale Anticline gas field, near Pinedale, Wyoming in the Green River basin.

Notes

External links
Pipeline Electronic Bulletin Board

Natural gas pipelines in the United States
Energy infrastructure in California
Energy infrastructure in Nevada
Energy infrastructure in Utah
Energy infrastructure in Wyoming
Buildings and structures in Kern County, California
Kern River
Natural gas pipelines in California
Natural gas pipelines in Wyoming
Natural gas pipelines in Nevada
Natural gas pipelines in Utah